Bruna Abdullah (born 24 October 1986) is a Brazilian actress working primarily in Bollywood. She played the role of "Mary" in the adult comedy film Grand Masti and Giselle in Punit Malhotra's I Hate Luv Storys (2010). She has also starred in the 2012 Tamil movie Billa II and in 2014 film Jai Ho  as Anne.

Biography 
Bruna was born in Guaíba, Brazil to a father of Lebanese descent and a mother of Italian-Portuguese ancestry. She came to India as a tourist and began working as an actress in Bollywood, moving her base to Mumbai, India from Brazil in order to set her career. She appeared in several advertising commercials for IndusInd Bank, Reebok, Fiama Di Wills and many more.

Abdullah's first video was with Shekhar Suman in his debut album Mere Gham Ke Dayare Mein. She performed in the song "Rehem Kare" for Anubhav Sinha's Cash.  She has appeared in a dance sequence in the movie Desi Boyz, released in 2011.
 
She participated in the reality TV Show Dancing Queen and also in reality TV Show Khatron Ke Khiladi. She was eliminated from Fear Factor on  9 September 2009, was a wild card re-entry on 17 September 2009, and eliminated on 24 September 2009.

Personal life 
She got engaged to her Scottish boyfriend Allan Frase on 25 July 2018. They got married in May 2019. The couple have a daughter.

Filmography

Film

Television

References

External links 

 

1986 births
Living people
Brazilian female models
Brazilian film actresses
Brazilian television actresses
Actresses from Rio Grande do Sul
Brazilian people of Lebanese descent
Brazilian people of Italian descent
Brazilian people of Portuguese descent
Brazilian expatriate actresses in India
Actresses in Hindi cinema
Actresses in Tamil cinema
Fear Factor: Khatron Ke Khiladi participants
21st-century Brazilian actresses